The 2018 Wuhan Open (also known as the 2018 Dongfeng Motor Wuhan Open for sponsorship reasons) was a women's tennis tournament played on outdoor hard courts between September 23–29, 2018. It was the 5th edition of the Wuhan Open, and part of the WTA Premier 5 tournaments of the 2018 WTA Tour. The tournament was held at the Optics Valley International Tennis Center in Wuhan, China.

Points and prize money

Point distribution

Prize money

Singles main-draw entrants

Seeds

 Rankings are as of September 17, 2018

Other entrants
The following players received wild cards into the singles main draw:
  Victoria Azarenka 
  Bernarda Pera
  Samantha Stosur
  Wang Qiang
  Zheng Saisai

The following players received entry from the singles qualifying draw:
  Viktorija Golubic
  Sofia Kenin
  Rebecca Peterson
  Monica Puig
  Kateřina Siniaková
  Sara Sorribes Tormo
  Wang Xiyu
  Wang Yafan

The following players received entry as lucky losers:
  Markéta Vondroušová
  Polona Hercog
  Monica Niculescu

Withdrawals
  Victoria Azarenka → replaced by  Markéta Vondroušová
  Mihaela Buzărnescu → replaced by  Kirsten Flipkens
  Kaia Kanepi → replaced by  Aleksandra Krunić
  Naomi Osaka  → replaced by   Polona Hercog
  Magdaléna Rybáriková  → replaced by   Monica Niculescu

Retirements
  Tímea Babos
  Madison Keys
  CoCo Vandeweghe
  Wang Qiang

Doubles main-draw entrants

Seeds

 Rankings are as of September 17, 2018

Other entrants
The following pairs received wildcards into the doubles main draw:
  Duan Yingying  /  Wang Yafan
  Jiang Xinyu  /  Wang Qiang

Withdrawals
During the tournament
  Vania King

Retirements
  CoCo Vandeweghe

Champions

Singles

  Aryna Sabalenka def.  Anett Kontaveit, 6–3, 6–3

Doubles

  Elise Mertens /  Demi Schuurs def.  Andrea Sestini Hlaváčková /  Barbora Strýcová, 6–3, 6–3

References

External links
 Official website

 
Wuhan Open
2018 in Chinese tennis
Wuhan Open
2018 in Chinese women's sport